Vico Magistretti (October 6, 1920 – September 19, 2006) was an Italian architect who was also active as an industrial designer, furniture designer, and academic. As a collaborator of humanist architect Ernesto Nathan Rogers, one of Magistretti's first projects was the "poetic" round church in the experimental Milan neighbourhood of QT8. He later designed mass-produced appliances, lighting, and furniture for companies such as Cassina S.p.A., Artemide, and Oluce. These designs won several awards, including the Compasso d'Oro and the Gold Medal of the Chartered Society of Industrial Artists & Designers in 1986.

Early life and education
Vico Magistretti was born on October 6, 1920 in Milan, Italy. He was the son of an architect. During the second world war, to avoid being deported to Germany, on September 8, 1943 he left Italy during his military service and moved to Switzerland. While in the country he taught at the local university and took courses at the Champ Universitaire Italien in Lausanne.

While in Switzerland he met Ernesto Nathan Rogers, who turned out to be his maestro. According to The Guardian, "He soon came under the influence of the architect Ernesto Nathan Rogers, whose humanist ideas for the reconstruction of postwar Italy inspired a whole series of intellectuals. At that time Magistretti took part in work on the extraordinary experimental neighbourhood on the edge of Milan known as QT8, where a group of architects and planners were given complete freedom. Magistretti built its "poetic" round church."

He returned to Milan in 1945, graduating from the Politecnico di Milano University in 1945.

Production career
After graduation he worked at the firm owned by his father, Pier Giulio, with the architect Paolo Chessa.

He worked initially in urban design in Milan. In the 1950s he moved into the field of mass-produced furniture and lamps. Some became museum pieces. Among other, he worked for the following companies: Artemide, Cassina, De Padova, Flou, Fritz Hansen, Kartell, Schiffini.

According to The Guardian, "His first great success came with the world famous Carimate chair produced by the Cassina company. The chair was a bestseller for years and mixed rural simplicity (the straw of the seat) with urban sophistication. There were the smooth lines of the wooden supports and legs, the colour, the pop-art bright red frame and elements of Scandinavian design."

Museum exhibits
Magistretti's works have been shown in the most important international museums in Europe,
USA, and Japan. Some have also been included in various permanent exhibitions museums such as MoMa.

In 2021, to celebrate the centenary of Magistretti's birth the Palazzo dell’Arte of the Triennale in Milan staged an exhibition his life's work.

Awards
Vico Magistretti received many awards, among which: the Gold Medal at the 1951 Triennale, the Grand Prix at the 1954 Triennale, two Compasso d'Oro awards in the years 1967 and 1979 as well as the Gold Medal of the Chartered Society of Industrial Artists & Designers in 1986.

Affiliations  and fellowships
He taught for 20 years at the Royal College of Arts (RCA) in London and was appointed as a Royal Designer for Industry (RDI). He also taught at Domus Academy in Milan and was an honorary member of the Royal Scottish Incorporation of Architects.

Influence and legacy
Magistretti's work is held in the collections of many museums including the Pompidou Centre in Paris, the Museum of Modern Art and Metropolitan Museum in New York, and the ADI Design Museum in Milan.

In an interview with Jasper Morrison, once a student of his at the RCA, the designer recollected a conversation with Magistretti about the practice of industrial design:We met at Linate [airport], we were getting on the plane to London, he was 75 years old, I was 35, and he told me: "We are the luckiest people in the world to do this job". That phrase echoed in me, I was already so disappointed at the beginning of my career, but he was retired and full of enthusiasm.Magistretti's wife Paola died in 1998. He died on September 19, 2006, and was survived by his son, Stefano, and daughter, Susanna. His legacy is overseen by the Vico Magistretti Foundation.

Gallery

Publications

References

External links

 Vico Magistretti Foundation
 Guardian obituary, 18 October 2006
 "Designboom.com",Vico Magistretti

1920 births
2006 deaths
20th-century Italian architects
Italian industrial designers
Polytechnic University of Milan alumni
Italian furniture designers
Industrial design
Designers
Compasso d'Oro Award recipients
Royal Designers for Industry